This list of longest natural arches ranks the world's natural arches by the length of their span as defined and measured by the Natural Arch and Bridge Society (NABS).

As a disclaimer, the NABS states that the information in this list, and therefore the rankings, may change due to more accurate measurements in the future, changes in span length due to natural forces, and the discovery of previously undocumented arches.

Longest natural arches
Sort by clicking on column headings, excepting only the Image and Notes columns.

References

Arches

Arches
Arches, natural